Louis-Pierre Hélie (born 1 January 1986 at Berthierville, Quebec) is a Canadian alpine and freestyle skier.

He competed at the 2010 Winter Olympics in Vancouver in the men's super combined competition. He made a total of 30 starts on the Alpine Skiing World Cup, with his best result being a 13th place at the Val Gardena downhill in 2010. Subsequently in 2012 he switched from alpine skiing to ski cross, making his debut on the FIS Freestyle Skiing World Cup at the first ski cross event of the 2012–13 season in Nakiska.

References

External links
 Louis-Pierre Helie's bio
 http://lphelie.weebly.com/
 Louis-Pierre Hélie at the 2010 Winter Olympics

1986 births
Living people
Olympic alpine skiers of Canada
People from Lanaudière
Alpine skiers at the 2010 Winter Olympics
Canadian male alpine skiers
Canadian male freestyle skiers